Tomahawk Regional Airport  is a city owned public use airport located three nautical miles (6 km) west of the central business district of Tomahawk, a city in Lincoln County, Wisconsin, United States. It is included in the Federal Aviation Administration (FAA) National Plan of Integrated Airport Systems for 2021–2025, in which it is categorized as a local general aviation facility.

Although many U.S. airports use the same three-letter location identifier for the FAA and IATA, this facility is assigned TKV by the FAA but has no designation from the IATA (which assigned TKV to Tatakoto Airport in Tatakoto, Tuamotu, French Polynesia).

Facilities and aircraft 
Tomahawk Regional Airport covers an area of 280 acres (113 ha) at an elevation of 1,487 feet (453 m) above mean sea level. It has one runway designated 9/27 with an asphalt surface measuring 4,401 by 75 feet (1,341 x 23 m) with approved GPS approaches.

For the 12-month period ending August 12, 2021, the airport had 7,200 aircraft operations, an average of 20 per day: 97% general aviation and 3% air taxi. In February 2023, there were 15 aircraft based at this airport: 13 single-engine, 1 multi-engine and 1 glider.

See also 
 List of airports in Wisconsin

References

External links 
 Tomahawk Regional Airport
  at Wisconsin DOT Airport Directory
 

Airports in Wisconsin
Transportation in Lincoln County, Wisconsin